Aminoethanol may refer to:

 1-Aminoethanol
 Ethanolamine (2-aminoethanol, ETA, or MEA)